, better known by the mononym name Mako (sometimes stylised MAKO), is a Japanese voice actress, singer and a member of the band Bon-Bon Blanco, in which her prominent role is as the maraca player. She has also performed in a Japanese television drama called Meido in Akihabara. She is affiliated with I'm Enterprise. Her anime voice acting debut was in Kamichu! where, in the ending theme song, her character also plays the maracas. As Hinako Hiiragi in anime Chitose Get You!! she plays maracas again, in the ending theme (episodes 1–13).

Filmography

Anime
2005
Kamichu! as Yurie Hitotsubashi

2006
School Rumble: 2nd Semester as Karen Ichijō

2008
Kannagi: Crazy Shrine Maidens as Clerk (ep 10), Lolikko Cutie
Kyo no Gononi as Kazumi Aihara

2009
Sweet Blue Flowers as Child (ep 4), Primary School Student B (ep 1), The Flower (eps 5–6)
The Girl Who Leapt Through Space as Akiha Shishidō

2010
K-ON! as Classmate
Jewelpet Twinkle as Angelina, Charotte
Hanamaru Kindergarten as Koume
Fairy Tail as Natsu Dragneel (young)

2011
A-Channel as Hira-chan
Oniichan no Koto Nanka Zenzen Suki Janain Dakara ne—!! as Shizuru
C³ as Mummy Maker
Jewelpet Sunshine as Charotte
Nekogami Yaoyorozu as Yoshino

2012
Kono Naka ni Hitori, Imōto ga Iru! as Shiga
Saki Episode of Side A as Yū Matsumi
Jewelpet Kira Deco—! as Charotte, Maco
Chitose Get You!! as Hinako Hiiragi
Natsuiro Kiseki as Yuusuke
Natsuyuki Rendezvous as Fool

2013
Arpeggio of Blue Steel as Maya
Jewelpet Happiness as Charotte

2014
Saki: The Nationals as Yû Matsumi
Phi Brain: Kami no Puzzle as Girl

2015
My Love Story!! as Misaki

2016
Tsukiuta. The Animation as Ai Kisaragi

2018
Senran Kagura Shinovi Master -Tokyo Yōma-hen- as Ryōna

2019
Star Twinkle PreCure as Libra's Star Princess

OVA
Koe de Oshigoto! as Kanna Aoyagi
Kyō no Go no Ni as Kazumi Aihara
School Rumble: Third Semester as Karen Ichijō
Senran Kagura: Estival Versus – Festival Eve Full of Swimsuits as Ryōna

Video games
2011
Corpse Party: Book of Shadows as Sayaka Ooue

2014
Ar Nosurge as Nelico
Senran Kagura: Shinovi Versus as Ryōna

2015
Senran Kagura: Estival Versus as Ryōna
Yoru no nai kuni as Anas

2017
Senran Kagura: Peach Beach Splash as Ryōna

References

External links
 Official agency profile 
 

1986 births
Living people
I'm Enterprise voice actors
Japanese video game actresses
Japanese voice actresses
Maracas players
Voice actresses from Tokyo
21st-century Japanese actresses
21st-century Japanese women singers
21st-century Japanese singers
Atomi University alumni